The 2011 Individual Ice Racing World Championship were the final meetings took place from February 5 to March 27, 2011 and determined the world champion for the 2011 Individual Ice Racing World Championship. There were four final meetings (all two-day) with seventeen permanent riders and one wild card. The permanent riders were determined in three qualifying rounds.

Heat details

Final One - Krasnogorsk 
 5-6 February 2011
  Krasnogorsk, Moscow Oblast
City stadium "Zorkey" (Length: 440 m)
Referee:  Wojciech Grodzki
Jury President:  Milan Spinka
References

Day One

Day Two 
 (2) Knapp, ranked 15th ←→ (17) Järf
 (14) Tuinstra, ranked 16th ←→ (18) Klatovský

Final Two - Tolyatti 
 12-13 February 2011
  Tolyatti, Samara Oblast
Anatoly Stepanov Stadium (Length: 260 m)
Referee:  F.Ziegler
Jury President:  C.Bouin
References

Day Three 
 Pletschacher, ranked 16th ←→ (17) Knapp
 Järf, ranked 18th ←→ (18) Tuinstra

Day Four 
 Knapp, ranked 15th ←→ (17) Pletschacher
 Tuinstra, ranked 17th ←→ (18) Järf

Final Three - Assen 
 12-13 March 2011
  Assen, Drenthe
De Bonte Wever stadium (Length: 370 m)
Referee:  Frank Ziegler
Jury President:  Andrzej Grodzki
References     
Change:
Draw 4.  Johnny Tuinstra → René Stellingwerf

Day Five 
 Pletschacher, ranked 16th ←→ (17) Knapp
 Järf, ranked 18th ←→ (18) Tuinstra

Day Six 
 Koij, ranked 15th ←→ (17) Pletschacher
 Tuinstra, ranked 17th ←→ (18) Järf

Final Four - Inzell 
 26-27 March 2011
  Inzell, Bavaria
Eisstadion Inzell (Ludwig-Schwabl-Stadion) (Length: 400 m)
Referee:  Krister Gardell
Jury President:  Jörgen L. Jensen
References    
Change:
Draw 4.  Mats Järf → Jan Klatovský

Day Seven 
 Pletschacher, ranked 16th ←→ (17) Koij
 Järf, ranked 17th ←→ (18) Stellingwerf

Day Eight

See also 
 2011 Team Ice Racing World Championship
 2011 Speedway Grand Prix Qualification

References 

Ice speedway competitions
World Individual